The Ampeliscidae are a family of amphipods, distinct enough to warrant placement in a monotypic superfamily Ampeliscoidea. They are benthic, found at the bottom of seas and oceans. They are distributed worldwide, and are often abundant in areas with fine sediments. They live in infaunal tubes, constructed from "amphipod silk" and sediment.

Genera
 Ampelisca
 Byblis
 Byblisoides 
 Haploops

References

External links

Gammaridea
Taxa named by Achille Costa
Crustacean families